Konstantinos I. Tsioulkas (Greek: Κωνσταντίνος Ι. Τσιούλκας; 1845 - 1915) was a Greek educator and writer from Western Macedonia.

Biography 
Tsioulkas was born in 1845 in Korisos, Kastoria into a family of farmers. Most of the inhabitants of the village spoke Slavic as a first language, but Tsioulkas spoke Greek as his first language. After his graduation from the main school of his village he continued his studies with a scholarship in the Educational Association of Kastoria in the Gymnasium of Kasoria and then he taught in the "Greek school" of his birthplace. He opposed the attempts of the Exarchists to hold the Divine Liturgy in Bulgarian and in 1871 he succeeded together with others to drive Konstantinos Darzilovites, who, according to Tsioulkas, was the first to teach the Slavic speakers that they were Bulgarians, off Gorenchi, just before a Bulgarian school was founded. In 1875 he was sent with a scholarship from Bellios a bequest in Athens, where he studied in the Philosophic School of the National University. In 1879 he went to Monastiri (Bitola), where he became the first gymnasiarch of the Greek gymnasium for a decade, until 1889, when he was fired because of the events relating to Pichion.

Contributions to the bilingualism of the Macedonians

In 1907 he published in Athens a 350-page work of his Contributions to the bilingualism of the Macedonians by comparing the Slavic-seeming Macedonian language with the Greek one ("Συμβολαί εις την διγλωσσίαν των Μακεδόνων εκ συγκρίσεως της σλαυοφανούς μακεδονικής γλώσσης προς την ελληνικήν"), in order to fight against the Bulgarian and pan-Slavist propaganda in the region of Macedonia. Tsioulkas, who claimed not to speak any Slavic language, tried by distorting historical linguistics to prove that the language of the Slavic speakers in Ottoman Macedonia wasn't Bulgarian, but an Ancient Greek dialect. Tsioulkas didn't focus on phonology, syntax, or morphology, for which he only devoted 11 pages in total, but mainly on the vocabulary, where it is easy to find words with common, Indo-European, etymology with Greek, in order to show that the basic elements of the Macedonian vocabulary weren't Slavic, but originated from Greek. To prove that the language of the Slavophones was closer to Ancient Greek than Modern Greek, he composed a list of homeric words and compared how many of them survive in the "people's" language, meaning demotic, (650) and how many in the "Slavic-seeming Macedonian" (1260). The conclusion, for Tsioulkas, was that the "Slavic-seeming Macedonian [language] was a sister of the Greek [language]" and the "Macedonian people" were native and descended from the Ancient Macedonians.

This book was the most important in a series of pseudolinguistic publications that appeared in Greece from the beginning to the middle of the 20th century, whose writers without knowing the dialects they were writing about maintained that the "mixed" or "Slavic-seeming" dialects of the Slavophones weren't Slavic. No Greek linguist supported Tsioulkas' theory, but the book was republished in 1991, during the Macedonia naming dispute, without negative commentary, but with a commendatory exordium of the former minister Nikolaos Martis. The book is still in circulation today and references to it continue to appear in the blogosphere, resulting in Tsioulkas having unwittingly contributed to the idea that modern-day ethnic Macedonians are descended from the ancient Macedonians and are their true inheritors.

References

Sources

External links 

 Webpage of the Institute of Neohellenic Studies-Pandektes, Τσιούλκας Κωνσταντίνος

Greek educators
Pseudolinguistics
People from Kastoria (regional unit)
1845 births
1915 deaths